Claire Tomalin (née Delavenay; born 20 June 1933) is an English journalist and biographer, known for her biographies of Charles Dickens, Thomas Hardy, Samuel Pepys, Jane Austen and Mary Wollstonecraft.

Early life
Tomalin was born Claire Delavenay on 20 June 1933 in London, the daughter of English composer Muriel Herbert and French academic Émile Delavenay.

Education
Tomalin was educated at Hitchin Girls' Grammar School, a former state grammar school in Hitchin in Hertfordshire, at Dartington Hall School, a former boarding-school in Devon, and at Newnham College at the University of Cambridge.

Career
Tomalin has written several noted biographies. 
 In 1974 she published her first book The Life and Death of Mary Wollstonecraft, which won the Whitbread Book Award. 
Since then she has published:
 Shelley and His World (1980)
 Katherine Mansfield: A Secret Life (1987) 
The Invisible Woman: The story of Nelly Ternan and Charles Dickens (1990) NCR Book Award, Hawthornden, James Tait Black Prize- now a film 
 Mrs Jordan's Profession (1994)
 Jane Austen: A Life (1997) 
Samuel Pepys: the Unequalled Self (2002)  Whitbread biography and Book of the Year prizes, Pepys Society Prize, Rose Mary Crawshay Prize. 
 Thomas Hardy: The Time-Torn Man (2006), followed by a television film about Hardy, and published a collection of Hardy's poems. 
 Charles Dickens: A Life (2011)
 The Young H. G. Wells: Changing the World (2021)
 She also edited and introduced Mary Shelley's story for children, Maurice. A collection of her reviews, Several Strangers, appeared in 1999.

Tomalin organised two exhibitions about the Regency actress Mrs Jordan at Kenwood House in 1995, and about Mary Wollstonecraft and Mary Shelley in 1997. In 2004 she unveiled a blue plaque for Mary Wollstonecraft at 45 Dolben Street, Southwark, where Wollstonecraft lived from 1788. She has served on the Committee of the London Library, and as a Trustee of the National Portrait Gallery and the Wordsworth Trust. She is a Vice-President of the Royal Literary Fund, the Royal Society of Literature and of English PEN. She is also a member of the American Philosophical Society.

Personal life
Tomalin married her first husband, fellow Cambridge graduate Nicholas Tomalin, a prominent journalist, in 1955, and they had three daughters and two sons. He was killed while reporting on the Arab-Israeli Yom Kippur War in 1973. She worked in publishing and journalism as literary editor of the New Statesman, then The Sunday Times, while bringing up her children. She married the novelist and playwright Michael Frayn in 1993. They live in Petersham, London.

Awards and honours
James Tait Black Memorial Prize, The Invisible Woman (1990)
Hawthornden Prize, The Invisible Woman (1991)
Whitbread Book Award, Samuel Pepys: The Unequalled Self (2002)
Rose Mary Crawshay Prize, Samuel Pepys: The Unequalled Self (2003)
Samuel Pepys Award of the Samuel Pepys Club, Samuel Pepys: The Unequalled Self (2003)
Samuel Johnson Prize, shortlist, Samuel Pepys: The Unequalled Self (2003)
Honorary Member Magdalene College, Cambridge (2003)
Honorary Fellow Lucy Cavendish College, Cambridge (2003), Newnham College; Cambridge (2004)
Honorary D.Litt: UEA (2005); Birmingham (2005); Greenwich (2006); Cambridge (2007); Goldsmith (2009); Open University (2008); Roehampton (2011); Portsmouth (2012)
Costa Book Awards (Biography), shortlist, Charles Dickens: A Life (2011)
Biographers International Organization Annual Award (2016)
Bodley Medal (2018)

Works
 The Young H. G. Wells: Changing the World (New York, Penguin Books, 2021)
 A Life of My Own (London, Penguin Books, 2017). Autobiography.
 Charles Dickens: A Life (New York, Penguin Books, 2011).
 Thomas Hardy: The Time-Torn Man (New York, Penguin Press, 2007).
 Samuel Pepys: The Unequalled Self, (New York, Alfred A. Knopf, 2002) ( or 0-14-028234-3).
 Jane Austen: A Life (Vintage eBooks, 2000)
 Several Strangers; writing from three decades (London, Viking Books, 1999); (New York, Penguin, 2000).
 Katherine Mansfield: A Secret Life (London, Viking, 1987), 1998.
 Mrs. Jordan's Profession: The Story of a Great Actress and a Future King, 1995.
 The Invisible Woman: The Story of Nelly Ternan and Charles Dickens (London, Viking, 1990) (New York, Knopf, 1991).
 Shelley and His World (London, Thames and Hudson, 1980); (New York, Charles Scribner's Sons, 1980).
 The Life and Death of Mary Wollstonecraft (London, Weidenfeld & Nicolson, 1974), 1992.

References

Further reading
 "Aida Edemariam meets Claire Tomalin", The Guardian, 18 November 2006
 "Claire Tomalin: a Life in Words", BBC News, 29 January 2003
Gardner, Anthony (2003). "An encounter with the acclaimed biographer of Samuel Pepys", from The Telegraph Magazine
 Wood, Gaby (26 January 2003). "The Observer Profile: Claire Tomalin", The Observer.

External links 
 Official website
 
 Claire Tomalin at British Council Literature
 

1933 births
Alumni of Newnham College, Cambridge
Costa Book Award winners
English journalists
English biographers
Fellows of Newnham College, Cambridge
Fellows of the Royal Society of Literature
James Tait Black Memorial Prize recipients
Living people
Rose Mary Crawshay Prize winners
The Sunday Times people
Mary Wollstonecraft scholars
British women biographers